The 1983-84 French Rugby Union Championship was won by Béziers beating Agen in the final.

Formula 

Forty clubs divide into five pools of eight.

Ten teams (the first two of each pool) are admitted directly into the "last 16" round,

The 3rd and 4th of each pool and the better two classified as 5th, play a barrage.

Qualification round 

The teams are listed as the ranking, in bold the teams admitted directly to "last 16" round.

Knoxkout stages

Barrage 
In bold the clubs qualified for the next round

"Last 16" 
In bold the clubs qualified for the next round.

Quarter of finals 
In bold the clubs qualified for the next round

Semifinals

Final

External links
 Compte rendu finale 1984 lnr.fr

1984
France 1984
Championship